"I Can See Clearly Now" is a song written and recorded by American singer Johnny Nash. It was the lead single from his album I Can See Clearly Now and achieved success in the United States and the United Kingdom when it was released in 1972, reaching number one on the U.S. Billboard Hot 100 and Cash Box charts. It also reached number one in Canada and South Africa. The song has been covered by many artists throughout the years, including a hit version by Lee Towers that reached no. 19 in the Dutch Top 40 in 1982, and another recorded by Jimmy Cliff for the motion picture soundtrack of Cool Runnings that peaked at no. 18 on the U.S. Billboard Hot 100 in 1993.

Writing and recording
After Nash wrote and composed the original version, he recorded it in London with members of the Fabulous Five Inc., and produced it himself. The song's arrangements and style are both heavily laced with reggae influences, as Nash had earlier collaborated with Bob Marley and his approach drew strongly from Marley's reggae style.

Chart performance
After making modest chart advances for a month, the RIAA-certified gold single unexpectedly took only two weeks to vault from No. 20 to No. 5 to No. 1 on the Billboard Hot 100 on November 4, 1972, remaining atop this chart for four weeks, and also spent the same four weeks atop the adult contemporary chart.

Weekly charts

Year-end charts

Certifications

Jimmy Cliff version

Jamaican reggae singer Jimmy Cliff recorded a cover of the song for the 1993 movie Cool Runnings. It was released as a single in 1993, reaching No. 18 on the Billboard Hot 100. It was Cliff's first single to make the Hot 100 in 25 years and is his highest-charting single in the United States. The song reached No. 1 in France, Iceland, and New Zealand. The music video for this version was directed by Academy Award nominated film director, Scott Hamilton Kennedy.

Critical reception
Larry Flick from Billboard wrote, "Cliff manages to breathe freshness into this oft-covered pop nugget. His laid-back vocal is matched by a relatively faithful arrangement (except for the delicate reggae flavors). Already amassing praise at adult formats, track is a good bet for eventual top 40 success."

Charts

Weekly charts

Year-end charts

Sales and certifications

Other notable covers
A version by Ray Charles was included on his 1977 album True to Life and in 2021 on the compilation box set True Genius.
Irish band Hothouse Flowers released their version as the second single from their album Home in 1990. It reached No. 5 in Ireland, No. 22 in Australia and No. 23 in the UK.
Buffalo Rose and R&B singer INEZ released their cover version as a single in 2021, later named one of the best songs of the year by WYEP-FM.
A version by Lee Towers reached the top Dutch top 40, charting at No. 19, and was recorded on his 1982 album New York.
Viola Wills recorded a dance/hi-NRG version,  released as a single-only in 1993.
The French singer Claude François also recorded a version of this song called "Toi et le soleil". Singers of musical Belles belles belles covered the Claude François' song.
Willie Nelson also made a version, included in the album Stardust (Willie Nelson Album) (1999 version)

References

External links
 Lyrics of this song
 

1972 songs
1972 singles
1993 singles
Johnny Nash songs
Jimmy Cliff songs
Hothouse Flowers songs
Songs written by Johnny Nash
RPM Top Singles number-one singles
Billboard Hot 100 number-one singles
Cashbox number-one singles
Number-one singles in Iceland
Number-one singles in South Africa
SNEP Top Singles number-one singles
Number-one singles in New Zealand
Epic Records singles
Columbia Records singles